T. N. Anandanayaki (1931-2001) was an Indian politician and former Member of the Legislative Assembly of Tamil Nadu.She also served as the president of the Tamil Nadu Congress Committee. She was elected to the Tamil Nadu legislative assembly as an Indian National Congress candidate from Basin Bridge (State Assembly Constituency)(Two Times) and Mylapore (State Assembly Constituency)

Early life 
Born in 1931; Educated at Nehru Board High School Papanasam, Presidency college and Madras law college. 
She was a member of Indian National Congress Party (INCP) from 1946.

References 

Indian National Congress politicians from Tamil Nadu
2001 deaths
1931 births
Indian National Congress (Organisation) politicians
Madras MLAs 1962–1967
Madras MLAs 1957–1962
Tamil Nadu MLAs 1971–1976